Podocarpus decumbens is a species of conifer in the family Podocarpaceae. It is found only in New Caledonia. It is threatened by habitat loss.

References

decumbens
Vulnerable plants
Taxonomy articles created by Polbot